Salza may refer to:

Places
 Salza, Aude, France
 Salza di Pinerolo, Metropolitan City of Turin, Piedmont, Italy
 Salza Irpina, Avellino, Campania, Italy

Rivers
 Salza (Saale), in Saxony-Anhalt, Germany
 Salza (Unstrut), in Thuringia, Germany
 Salza (Enns), in Austria

People
 Hermann von Salza (1165–1239), fourth Grand Master of the Teutonic Knights
 Hermann Salza (1885–1946), an Estonian rear admiral
 Nicholas D'Antonio Salza (1916–2009), American bishop

See also

 Salsa (disambiguation)